The following is a list of 2018 box office number-one films in France.

References 

2018
France
2018 in French cinema